Dean is a hamlet in Spelsbury civil parish, about  north of Charlbury and  southeast of Chipping Norton, Oxfordshire. Its toponym derives from the fact that it is between the valleys of the Coldron Brook  and one of its tributaries.

History
At a junction of two lanes in the centre of Dean is the base of a medieval preaching cross. Spelsburydown is a 17th-century house that was re-fronted in the 18th century. It is of coursed squared limestone with ashlar dressings and has a Stonesfield slate roof.

Dean Mill is a watermill on Coldron Brook. It was probably built in the 18th century and altered probably in the 20th century. The building is of coursed rubble with a Stonesfield slate roof.  Dean Manor House was built early in the 18th century, reputedly in 1702 for Thomas Rowney, MP for Oxford. It is of coursed rubble with ashlar dressings.  Dean Manor Cottage is a small house built early in the 18th century. It is of coursed rubble with a Stonesfield slate roof. Pear Tree Cottage is a mid-18th century small house built of coursed limestone rubble.

Notable people
Dean is the home of Peter Gummer, Baron Chadlington and the constituency home of the former UK Prime Minister David Cameron. It was also the home of the family of Ronnie Barker.

References

Hamlets in Oxfordshire
West Oxfordshire District